Guillermo Coppola is an Argentine businessman. He was born in Buenos Aires in 1948. He worked as the agent of over two hundred football players, and eventually became the agent of Diego Maradona. His relation with Maradona turned him into a famous television personality. He is the TV host of "Yo, Guillermo" in Canal 5 Noticias. He wrote an autobiography, "Guillote", published by Planeta, that became a best-seller in just 2 weeks.

References

Argentine sportspeople
Argentine businesspeople
Argentine television personalities
People from Buenos Aires
1948 births
Living people